Lindsay Davenport was the defending champion, but was off the Tour indefinitely due to pregnancy.

Seeds

Draw

Finals

Top half

Bottom half

References

External links
Draw

2009 ATP World Tour
2009 WTA Tour
Singles
2009 Singles